Joginapally Venkat Narsing Rao was an Indian politician belonging to Indian National Congress. He was one of the signatories from the Telangana region in Gentlemen's agreement of Andhra Pradesh (1956). He was the Deputy Chief Minister in Andhra Pradesh in 1972.

Life
He won as an MLA from Luxettipet in two successive elections in 1967 and 1972 and was also made a Deputy Chief Minister in his second stint.

He was married.

References

Deputy Chief Ministers of Andhra Pradesh
Indian National Congress politicians from Telangana